David II (1756 – 11 January 1795), of the Bagrationi Dynasty, was King of Imereti (western Georgia) from 1784 to 1789 and from 1790 to 1791.

Life
He was the son of George IX of Imereti, who had briefly ruled in 1741. After the death of his cousin, King Solomon I, he became a regent but prevented the rival princes David (the future king Solomon II) and George from being crowned. With the support of Katsia II Dadiani, prince of Mingrelia, he seized the throne and proclaimed himself king on May 4, 1784. He attempted to establish a contact with Imperial Russia and to restrict the powers of great nobles. In 1787 David sent the poet Besiki ostensibly to negotiate with the Russians (Besiki was rumoured to be the lover of David’s queen). Besiki lingered in the Ukraine until 1789, forbidden to proceed to St Petersburg, and eventually dying in Iaşi. David's policy drew many leading aristocrats, including the Mingrelian prince Grigol Dadiani, into opposition. In 1789, King Heraclius II of Georgia sent his army into Imereti and helped David-Solomon to expel David II into Akhaltsikhe in the Ottoman-held Georgian province. In 1790, he returned with a Turkish force and deposed Solomon II, but was eventually defeated and fled Imereti. Later, through the mediation of Heraclius, David was allowed to return to Imereti and granted a fiefdom. Between 1792 and 1794, he attempted, with the Dagestan mercenaries, to reclaim the crown, but suffered a defeat and withdrew from Imereti. In January 1795, David died of smallpox while in exile at Akhaltsikhe.

Family 
David married to Ana Orbeliani (1765–1832), daughter of Prince Mamuka Orbeliani. They were the parents of: 

 Princess Tamar (1781 – 7 April 1840), wife of Prince Simon Eristavi of Guria.
 Princess Mzekhatun (1783 – 2 February 1829), wife of Prince Simon Tsereteli (1773–1855).
 Princess Marta (born 1784)
 Prince Constantine (1789–1844), heir to the throne of Imereti, subsequently major-general of the Russian service.

David also had natural children:

 Prince Rostom (died 1820), whose son, Vakhtang, rose in revolt against the Russian rule in 1820.
 Princess Anastasia (died c. 1818), wife of Prince Davit Agiashvili.

References

Bibliography

English 
Rayfield, D. (2013) Edge of Empires: A History of Georgia, Reaktion Books, 
David Marshall Lang, The Last Years of the Georgian Monarchy, 1658-1832. New York: Columbia University Press, 1957.

Georgian
საქართველოს მეფეები, მ. ლორთქიფანიძისა და რ. მეტრეველის რედაქცია, თბ., ნეკერი, 2000
შ. ბურჯანაძე, იმერეთის სამეფოს საშინაო პოლიტიკა 1789–1802 წლებში, თბ., 1962
შ. ბურჯანაძე, იმერეთის სამეფოს პოლიტიკური ისტორიისათვის 1784–1789 წლებში, ხელნაწერთა ინსტიტუტის მოამბე, ტ. II, თბ., 1960
მ. რეხვიაშვილი, იმერეთის სამეფო 1462–1810 წწ., თბ., 1989
ქ. ჩხატარაიშვილი, დასავლეთ საქართველო XVIII ს–ის პირველ ნახევარში, სინ, ტ. IV, თბ., 1973
ალ. ხახანაშვილი, მეფე იმერეთისა სოლომონ II, ტფ., 1910
მ. სურგულაძე, ბაგრატიონთა სამეფო სახლი, გენეალოგიური ტაბულის შემდგენლები მ. სურგულაძე, მ. ქავთარია, თბ., 1975

1756 births
1795 deaths
Bagrationi dynasty of the Kingdom of Imereti
Kings of Imereti
18th-century people from Georgia (country)
Deaths from smallpox
Eastern Orthodox monarchs
Georgian emigrants to the Ottoman Empire